Hellfire is the third studio album by Norwegian black metal band 1349. It was released on 24 May 2005 through Candlelight Records.

A music video was produced for the track "Sculptor of Flesh". The video, directed by Judd Tilyard, alternates between footage of the band performing the song in Norway and clips of surgery filmed in Australia.  The closing track of the album, "Hellfire", was intentionally recorded at 13:49 in length to spell out the band name.

Track listing 
 "I Am Abomination" – 4:09
 "Nathicana" – 4:38
 "Sculptor of Flesh" – 3:17
 "Celestial Deconstruction" – 7:44
 "To Rottendom" – 5:51
 "From the Deeps" – 6:25
 "Slaves to Slaughter" – 6:11
 "Hellfire" – 13:49

Personnel 
 Archaon – guitar
 Tjalve – guitar
 Frost – drums
 Seidemann – bass guitar
 Ravn – vocals

Production
1349 – production
Ronni Le Tekrø – production
Kjartan Hesthagen – engineering

References

External links 
 Hellfire on 1349's official website

2005 albums
1349 (band) albums
Candlelight Records albums